Eduard Reisinger (born 12 June 1957) is an Austrian sprint canoer who competed in the early 1980s. At the 1980 Summer Olympics in Moscow, he was eliminated in the semifinals of the K-4 1000 m event.

References
Sports-Reference.com profile

External links

1957 births
Austrian male canoeists
Canoeists at the 1980 Summer Olympics
Living people
Olympic canoeists of Austria
Place of birth missing (living people)